Angelo Tommasi (17 November 1911 - 24 June 2004) was an Italian high jumper who competed at the 1932 Summer Olympics. He was the brother of the other Olympic athlete Virgilio Tommasi.

National titles
He won five national championships at individual senior level.

Italian Athletics Championships
High jump: 1931, 1932, 1933, 1935, 1936

See also
 Men's high jump Italian record progression

References

External links
 

1911 births
2004 deaths
Athletes (track and field) at the 1932 Summer Olympics
Italian male high jumpers
Olympic athletes of Italy